Ballycong is a small townland southeast of Ballina, located between the River Moy and the Ox Mountains.

Ballycong Lough lies to the west of the townland, and the village of Attymass to the east. The peat bogs that dominate the landscape of the area were the inspiration for a poem, entitled 'Ballycong', by Mark Wheatley.

References

Townlands of County Mayo